Stacey Finley is the Nichole A. and Thuan Q. Pham Professor and Associate Professor of Chemical Engineering and Materials Science, and Quantitative and Computational Biology at the University of Southern California. Finley has a joint appointment in the Department of Chemical Engineering and Materials Science, and she is a member of the  USC Norris Comprehensive Cancer Center. Finley is also a standing member of the MABS Study Section at NIH. Her research has been supported by grants from the NSF, NIH, and American Cancer Society.

Early life and education 
Finley held an interest in science and math since an early age and so pursued engineering, stating that it was an "analytical decision" for her: "I had this equation -- what am I good at, what am I interested in, and how do those things fit together?" Finley studied chemical engineering at Florida A&M University, graduating summa cum laude. She went on to study at Northwestern University for her graduate program, working with Linda Broadbelt and Vassily Hatzimanikatis. During her doctorate she developed a computational framework, BNICE, to predict novel biodegradation pathways with applications for bioremediation. Finley was a postdoctoral fellow at Johns Hopkins University, where she worked with Aleksander S. Popel. There she studied the signaling pathways of VEGF, a protein that contributes to angiogenesis. She created a physiologically-based computational framework to study VEGF kinetics and transport that can better inform cancer therapies.

Research and career 
Finley started her computational systems biology lab at USC Viterbi in 2013. Her lab leverages computational models to interrogate angiogenesis, metabolism, and immunotherapy. Finley's lab has built mathematical models to predict CAR T cell response to variations in protein expression.

In 2017 Finley was appointed the Gordon S. Marshall Early Career Chair Director for Computational Modeling of Cancer. She is also an active participant in increasing diversity in STEM, either by visiting middle and high schools or through panels to encourage under-represented minorities to pursue STEM careers.

In 2022, she served as a Visiting Professor at EPFL - École polytechnique fédérale de Lausanne.

Awards and honors 
Her awards and honors include:

 2006 National Science Foundation Graduate Research Fellowship
 2008 Merck Poster Award
 2010-2021 UNCF/Merck Postdoctoral Science Research Fellowship
 2010 National Institutes of Health Ruth L. Kirschstein National Research Service Award
 2011 Elmer Gaden Jr. Award from the journal Biotechnology and Bioengineering
 2013-2017 Gabilan Assistant Professorship (2013-2017)
 2014 National Academy of Engineering Participant in Frontiers in Engineering Education Symposium
 2015 Diverse: Issues in Higher Education Emerging Scholar Award
 2015 Emerging Scholar Award from the publication Diverse: Issues in Higher Education
 2015 Rose Hills Foundation Research Fellowship
 2016 Keystone Symposia Fellow
 2016  National Science Foundation CAREER Award
 2016 CMBE Young Innovator
 2016 National Academy of Engineering Frontiers in Engineering
 2017 Leah-Edelstein Keshet Prize, Society of Mathematical Biology
 2017 Hanna Reisler Mentorship Award
 2017 USC Viterbi Junior Research Award
 2017-2021 Gordon S. Marshall Early Career Chair
 2018 Outstanding Young Engineer, Orange County Engineering Council
 2018 American Association for Cancer Research NextGen Star
 2021 Fellow, American Institute for Medical and Biological Engineering
 2022-Present, Nichole A. and Thuan Q. Pham Professorship
 2022 Fellow, Biomedical Engineering Society

References 

American geneticists
American biologists
University of Southern California faculty
Florida A&M University alumni
Northwestern University alumni
Living people
Year of birth missing (living people)
American women biologists
21st-century American women